Łukasz Kopka (born 3 January 1996) is a Polish professional footballer who plays as a midfielder for Concordia Elbląg.

Senior career

Kopka began his career with Lechia Gdańsk. Having progressed through the youth teams Kopka joined the Lechia second team, playing a total of 12 games for the team. In 2015 he moved on season long loan to Legionovia Legionowo where he ended up scoring his first professional goal. After his loan, he made a permanent move to ŁKS Łódź, with whom he played for the 2016-17 season. After the season, Kopka moved once again, this time joining GKS Przodkowo. In March 2018 he was released from his contract with Przodkowo and moved to play in the Swedish leagues, firstly with Värmbols FC in 2018 before joining Assyriska FF in 2019.

References

1996 births
Living people
Sportspeople from Gdańsk
Sportspeople from Pomeranian Voivodeship
Polish footballers
Association football midfielders
Lechia Gdańsk II players
Legionovia Legionowo players
ŁKS Łódź players
Assyriska FF players
Polish expatriate footballers
Expatriate footballers in Sweden
Polish expatriate sportspeople in Sweden
II liga players
III liga players